Boneyard is a ghost town in Alcorn County, Mississippi, United States.  It was located  miles west of Corinth.

History
Boneyard was established by William Powell in the 1830s along a stage coach route running between Jacinto, Mississippi and La Grange, Tennessee.  The settlement was humorously called "Boneyard" because Powell was a very lean man. Boneyard had a cabinetmaker's shop, a blacksmith, three mercantile establishments, a cabinetmaker’s shop, a Masonic lodge (No. 179), a tan yard, a saddler's shop, the Boneyard School, and a carding machine where wool was carded for people living within a  radius.  The population reached about 100.

Boneyard was destroyed by the Union Army during the American Civil War, and was never rebuilt.

References

Former populated places in Alcorn County, Mississippi
Ghost towns in Mississippi
Settlements destroyed during the American Civil War